Snively may refer to:

People
 Mary Agnes Snively (1847–1933), first president of the Canadian Society of Superintendents of Training Schools for Nurses
 Samuel F. Snively (1859–1952), mayor of Duluth, Minnesota, USA, 1921–1937
 Cornelia Ellis Snively, former wife of George Wallace, former governor of Alabama, USA, married January 4, 1971
 Jacob Snively, (?-1871), Arizona pioneer that found the placer gold that began Arizona's first gold rush at what became Gila City, Arizona.
 Joe Snively, (1996), American ice hockey player
 John A. Snively, citrus fruit magnate in Winter Haven and Cypress Gardens, Florida and Waycross, Georgia
 John H. Snively, chemist and engraver, mid-19th century
Suzanne Snively, economist 
 A. Barr Snively, University of New Hampshire football, lacrosse and hockey coach, 1953–1964, Snively Arena was named after him
 Susannah Snively wife of Brigham Young, married 1844
 Robert Snively, former mayor of Essex, Ontario
 Carlisle Snively, past headmaster (1948–1980) for The Wyndcroft School
 Thomas V. Snively III, singer, musician, and guitar player, Grandson of Thomas V. Snively, citrus fruit magnet in Winter Haven, Florida and Cypress Gardens, Florida, cousin of country musician Gram Parsons

Fictional characters
 Snively, nephew and minion of Dr. Ivo Robotnik and antagonist in the Sonic the Hedgehog cartoons and comics.
 Norman Snively, an alcoholic clown, in the movie Air Bud.
 Snively, Mrs. Throckmorton's prankster nephew in the movie Yogi's First Christmas.

Places
 Snively Arena, a recreation facility adjacent to Whittemore Center on the campus of the University of New Hampshire
 Snively Street Wetland Complex, a wetland in Oak Ridges Moraine, Richmond Hill Township, Ontario, Canada